Georgina García Pérez and Sara Sorribes Tormo were the reigning champions, but chose not to participate.

Monica Niculescu and Vera Zvonareva won the title, defeating Estelle Cascino and Jessika Ponchet in the final, 6–4, 6–4.

Seeds

Draw

Draw

External Links
Main Draw

Open de Limoges - Doubles
2021 Doubles